Cobalopsis valerius, the miaba skipper, is a species of skippers in the family Hesperiidae. It is found from Costa Rica to southern Brazil and Paraguay.

References

External links 

 Cobalopsis elegans at insectoid.info

Hesperiinae
Butterflies described in 1902
Fauna of Ecuador